The Ed and Zed Show is a BBC children's television programme which ran for nine episodes between October and December 1970.

It was presented by the disc jockey Ed Stewart, nicknamed "Stewpot", and was co-hosted by Zed, the "rebel robot". Zed was often cheeky to the sometimes bad-tempered Stewart.

This programme is now of very minor significance, except for one point. While the theme of robots rebelling against their masters is a common one in culture, this is quite possibly the only case where the audience were supposed to be on the robot's side.

One feature of the robot was that at the end of every show except the last, he would overload himself by going into hysteric laughter causing smoke to billow out of his back.

The programme featured excerpts from The Wizard of Oz and the newest Walt Disney films as well as a weekly music guest, including early appearances by Mud and Hot Chocolate. Out of a total of nine episodes that were made, seven still exist.

See also
 List of fictional robots and androids

References

BBC children's television shows
1970s British children's television series